Nexus is the second and final studio album by English boyband Another Level, released on 13 September 1999 in the United Kingdom by Northwestside records. The album includes the theme from Notting Hill, "From the Heart", released by the band in May 1999. The album includes the singles "Summertime" and "Bomb Diggy", which became the band's final single. The album peaked at number 7 on the UK Singles Chart. A limited edition version of the album (limited to 10,000 copies) with a bonus disc was made available on the day of release.

Track listing

Charts

Weekly charts

Year-end charts

Certifications

References 

Another Level (band) albums
1999 albums